Ann Lee (1753 – 1790) was a British botanical illustrator who also illustrated birds and insects.

Her father was James Lee, a Scottish nurseryman trading in Hammersmith, London, but is described in one source as "Botanist John Lee". Ann was a pupil of artist and illustrator Sydney Parkinson (1745-1771) until his early death at sea in the employment of Joseph Banks, and in Parkinson's will he left "whatever utensils that are useful in painting or drawing to Mr. Lee’s daughter, my scholar." In 2012 these "utensils" were reported to be in the collection of the National Library of Australia.

The Royal Botanic Gardens, Kew holds the Ann Lee Collection, presented to Kew in 1969. This comprises 165 illustrations of which some two thirds are attributed to Lee, the remaining 60 being on Chinese paper and believed to be by Chinese artists, thought to have been collected by her father in connection with his work supplying exotic plants to the gardens. Her works held by Kew will be included in a major project with the Oak Spring Garden Foundation to digitise the work of women botanical illustrators. The Royal Albert Memorial Museum in Exeter holds a collection of 79 of her drawings of butterflies, birds and insects.

A group of seven of her botanical illustrations, dated in 1771 when she was aged 17 or 18, sold for £3,125 at Christie's auction house in 2013.

References

1753 births
1790 deaths
Botanical illustrators
British bird artists
18th-century British artists
18th-century British women artists